"Million Little Miracles" is a song performed by American contemporary worship bands Elevation Worship and Maverick City Music, which features vocals from Joe L. Barnes. The song was released as the sixth track of the collaborative album, Old Church Basement on April 30, 2021. The song was written by Brandon Lake, Chris Brown, and Steven Furtick.

"Million Little Miracles" debuted at No. 23 on the US Hot Christian Songs chart, and at No. 7 on the Hot Gospel Songs chart, despite not being released as an official single.

Composition
The lyrics of the song are testimonial, as the singer expresses thankfulness for God's miracles, pointing toward his faithfulness over his life.

Critical reception
Joshua Andre, reviewing for 365 Days of Inspiring Media, gave a favorable opinion of the song, saying: "this song is powerful and important as it’s a great facilitator, ushering us into a heavenly moment with our heavenly Father."

Commercial performance
Following the release of the album, "Million Little Miracles" made its debut at No. 23 on the US Hot Christian Songs chart, and at No. 7 on the Hot Gospel Songs chart, both dated May 15, 2021.

Music videos
On April 30, 2021, Elevation Worship published the lyric video of the song on YouTube.

On May 10, 2021, Elevation Worship released the official music video of "Million Little Miracles" on their YouTube channel. The video shows Joe L. Barnes leading the song.

Charts

Weekly charts

Year-end charts

References

External links
 

2021 songs
Elevation Worship songs
Maverick City Music songs
Songs written by Steven Furtick
Songs written by Brandon Lake